The Omoloy is a river in Siberia, flowing into the Laptev Sea east of the river Lena. Administratively the basin of the Omoloy is part of the Sakha (Yakutia) administrative region of Russia.

There is a  protected area in the basin of the river. The now extinct Beringian steppe bison used to have its habitat in the area of the Omoloy.

Course
It flows roughly northwards across the tundra along a valley limited by the Sietinden Range to the west and the Kular Range to the east. Both ranges are part of the Verkhoyansk Range system.
The Omoloy flows through the East Siberian Lowland into the Laptev Sea. Its mouth is located in the eastern coast of the Buor-Khaya Gulf. The river freezes up in October and stays under ice until late May or early June.

Tributaries

See also
List of rivers of Russia
Verkhoyansk Range

References

External links
 Laptev Sea Basin
 Biostratigraphy of the Late Cenozoic East Siberia (Yakutia)
 Ecological problems
 1995 Expedition

Rivers of the Sakha Republic
East Siberian Lowland